The All-CEBL Team is an honour given out at the end of each Canadian Elite Basketball League (CEBL) season, honouring the ten best players in the league.

Teams

Most selections 
The following table only lists players with at least ten total selections.

References

All-Teams